is a former Japanese football player.

Playing career
Abe was born in Yamaguchi on 31 July 1974. After graduating from high school, he joined Sanfrecce Hiroshima in 1993. However he could not play many matches. In 1998, he moved to Vissel Kobe. He played as defensive midfielder and became a regular player. In 2001, he moved to his local club Yamaguchi Teachers in Regional Leagues. He retired end of 2001 season.

Club statistics

References

External links

biglobe.ne.jp

1974 births
Living people
Association football people from Yamaguchi Prefecture
Japanese footballers
J1 League players
Sanfrecce Hiroshima players
Vissel Kobe players
Renofa Yamaguchi FC players
Association football midfielders